Wielki Szyszak (literally High Wheel) is a mountain on the border between the Czech Republic and Poland. It is situated in the central (Silesian) part of the main mountain range of the Karkonosze, right above the village of Jagniątków. Its peak is at 1509 m above sea level. It is situated between Śnieżne Kotły and Śmielec.

Mount Wielki Szyszak is the tenth-highest mountain in the Czech Republic. There are numerous other peaks in the vicinity of Wielki Szyszak, such as the Sokolnik, Violik, Velky Sisak, Kotel and Tvaroznik.

References

Mountains of Poland
Mountains and hills of the Czech Republic
Mountain peaks of the Sudetes